Avaavau Avaavau (born 30 August 1965) is a Samoan boxer. He competed in the men's light welterweight event at the 1988 Summer Olympics. At the 1988 Summer Olympics, he lost to Khalid Rahilou of Morocco.

References

External links
 

1965 births
Living people
Samoan male boxers
Olympic boxers of Samoa
Boxers at the 1988 Summer Olympics
Place of birth missing (living people)
Light-welterweight boxers